Toms Brook School is a historic school building located at Toms Brook, Shenandoah County, Virginia. It was built in 1935–1936, and it is a two-story, "T"-shaped, red brick Colonial Revival-style school building.  It features a monumental portico with tall columns that support the pediment. 

The Virginia State Board of Education provided a $25,000 loan for its construction. The community also applied for $31,050 of Works Progress Administration funds for its construction, but the application was not approved. A cafeteria addition for the school was completed in 1952.

Toms Brook School was listed on the National Register of Historic Places in 2011.

References

School buildings on the National Register of Historic Places in Virginia
School buildings completed in 1936
Colonial Revival architecture in Virginia
Schools in Shenandoah County, Virginia
National Register of Historic Places in Shenandoah County, Virginia